Canaga is a rural locality in the Western Downs Region, Queensland, Australia.

Geography
The Chinchilla–Wondai Road runs through from west to east.

History 
The locality names is derived from the parish name which in turn was the name of a pastoral run held during the early 1850s by Arthur Lloyd and transferred to Joshua and Alexander Bell in 1853.

Canaga State School opened in November 1911 and closed on 1962. The school was located at 3258 Chinchilla Wondai Road. The site is now a recreation area managed by the Western Downs Regional Council.

Education 
There are no schools in Canaga. The nearest government primary schools are:

 Burra Burri State School in Burra Burri to the north-east
 Jandowae State School in Jandowae to the south-east
 Brigalow State School in Brigalow to the south
 Chinchilla State School in Chinchilla to the south-west

The nearest government secondary school is Jandowae State School (to Year 10) in Jandowae and Chinchilla State High School (to Year 12) in Chinchilla.

References

Further reading 

 

Western Downs Region
Localities in Queensland